
 

The Lake Ngapakaldi to Lake Palankarinna Fossil Area is a group of fossil sites located in the Australian state of South Australia within the Tirari Desert in the north-eastern part of the state's Far North region.

Description
They are surrounded by extensive areas of sand dunes in a flat, arid landscape. The lake beds are largely unvegetated and usually dry. Low cliffs on the western margins of the lakes have produced a variety of Tertiary vertebrate fossils ranging in age from the late Oligocene to the Pleistocene.

Lakes Kununka, Ngapakaldi and Pitikanta
The following three lakes are located on the west side of the gazetted locality of Mulka with Lake Ngapakaldi being partly located within the locality of Lake Eyre:  
 Lake Kununka 
 Lake Pitikanta 
 Lake Ngapakaldi

Lake Palankarinna
Lake Palankarinna  is located in the gazetted locality of Etadunna on the west side of the Birdsville Track to the south of the other three sites.  The lake is part of a reserve known as the ‘Lake Palankarinna Fossil Reserve’ which consists of part of the western half of the lake bed and a parcel of land to the west.

Status
The four sites are subject to a number of past and present heritage listings while one is located with a protected area:
All four sites were listed as one entity on the now-defunct Register of the National Estate (No.5905) on 21 October 1980.
Lakes Kanunka, Pitikanta and Ngapakaldi has been listed as state heritage places on the South Australian Heritage Register since 1997.
Lake Ngapakaldi is also partly located within the Kati Thanda-Lake Eyre National Park.
Lake Palankarinna and some adjoining land has been gazetted since 1954 as a ‘fossil reserve’ under what is currently known as the Pastoral Land Management and Conservation Act 1989 in order to “prevent the exploitation for profit of these areas by non-scientists.”  The fossil reserve has also been listed as a ‘state heritage place’ since 1993.

See also
List of fossil parks

References

Notes

Sources

Further reading
 Pledge, Neville S.; & Prideaux, Gavin John. (1996). The natural history of the Lake Palankarinna fossil reserve. South Australian Museum: Adelaide.
 

Oligocene paleontological sites
Miocene paleontological sites
Pliocene paleontological sites
Pleistocene paleontological sites of Australia
Ngapakaldi
Lake Eyre basin
Salt flats of Australia
South Australian places listed on the defunct Register of the National Estate
Far North (South Australia)
Fossil parks in Australia
South Australian Heritage Register
Cenozoic paleontological sites of Australia
Paleontology in South Australia